Huntleya meleagris is a species of orchid native to Brazil, Venezuela, Guyana, Colombia, Ecuador and Trinidad & Tobago.

References

External links 

meleagris
Orchids of South America
Flora of Trinidad and Tobago
Plants described in 1837
Flora without expected TNC conservation status